Franciszek Kęsy (1920–1942) was a Polish Roman Catholic anti-Nazi resistance fighter. One of the Poznań Five (Poznańska Piątka), he was guillotined in a prison in Dresden for his resistance work. He is one of the 108 Martyrs of World War II who were beatified by Pope John Paul II in 1999.

References 

1920 births
1942 deaths
108 Blessed Polish Martyrs
Polish people executed by Nazi Germany
People executed by Nazi Germany by guillotine
Polish resistance members of World War II